The House of Commons Standing Committee on Indigenous and Northern Affairs (INAN) is a standing committee of the House of Commons of Canada.  It was formerly known as the House of Commons Standing Committee on Aboriginal Affairs and Northern Development.

Mandate
The Standing Committee on Indigenous and Northern Affairs was established by the then new Department of Indian Affairs and Northern Development (now Indigenous and Northern Affairs Canada), in 1968. Although the mandate has changed many times, it is current, as of the 43rd Parliament.

The committee may study any issue of the department's management and operation, as well as any legislation, programs or policy areas. The department has taken responsibility primarily for on-reserve registered First Nations people, Inuit and northern or territorial affairs including considered legislation and issues related to these populations and subjects. The committee can also examine issues, policies and programs related to off-reserve registered and non-registered First Nations people, Métis, and Inuit. and, as of 2004, the Minister of Indigenous and Northern Affairs has been assigned the additional role of Federal Interlocutor for Métis and Non-Status Indians.

Membership

Sub-Committees
 Subcommittee on Agenda and Procedure (SINA)

External links
 Official website
 Committee List

References

1968 establishments in Canada
Crown-Indigenous Relations and Northern Development Canada
Indigenous